Joyce McDougall (26 April 1920, Dunedin, New Zealand – 24 August 2011, London, UK) was a New Zealand-French psychoanalyst.

McDougall wrote four major books in the field of psychoanalysis: Plea for a Measure of Abnormality (1978), In Theatre of the Mind: Illusion and Truth On the Psychoanalytical Stage (1982), Theatre of the Body: A Psychoanalytic Approach to Psychosomatic Illness (1989), and The Many Faces of Eros (1996).

See also
Disaffectation

References

External links
A Tribute to Dr. Joyce McDougall, by Susan Kavaler-Adler

1920 births
2011 deaths
French psychoanalysts
New Zealand emigrants to France